The Edmond de Rothschild Group is a financial institution specialized in private banking and asset management. Based in Geneva, the group is family-owned and independent, and encompasses the Edmond de Rothschild Foundations (philanthropic arm), the lifestyle brand Edmond de Rothschild Heritage (fine wine and cheese, luxury hotels and restaurants), and sponsors the Gitana Team (professional sailing team).

The group was founded in Paris in 1953 by Edmond de Rothschild as La Compagnie Financière (LCF) Edmond de Rothschild. After opening branches in Geneva and Luxembourg, the LCF launched the first fund of funds in 1969. In 1997, Benjamin and Ariane de Rothschild took over the governance of the company, which was reorganized and renamed Edmond de Rothschild Group in 2010.

In 2021, the group had 2,500 employees, 31 offices in 13 countries, and managed CHF 178 billion worth of assets. Ariane de Rothschild has been President of the board since April 2019, and François Pauly CEO since June 2021.

History

1953-1997: Edmond de Rothschild era 

In 1953, Edmond de Rothschild founded La Compagnie Financière (LCF) Edmond de Rothschild in Paris. He launched the Geneva-based private banking practice Banque Privée Edmond de Rothschild in 1965 and the branch in Luxembourg three years later.

In 1969, LCF Edmond de Rothschild introduced a new investment model, the fund of funds (FOF) management. In 1970, LCF Edmond de Rothschild was delivered a French banking licence. In 1973, LCF Edmond de Rothschild bought the Bank of California, and sold it back to Mitsubishi Bank in 1985 for thrice its acquisition price. In 1973, Edmond de Rothschild purchased the vineyard Château Clarke, appellation Listrac-Médoc, the first wine of the Edmond de Rothschild Heritage collection. In 1982, when David de Rothschild launched Paris-Orléans Gestion (Rothschild & Co), LCF Edmond de Rothschild took a 10% stake in the new structure.

In 1989, Benjamin de Rothschild, son of Edmond de Rothschild, founded the Compagnie de Trésorerie to offer advanced financial risk management services. In 1992, LCF Edmond de Rothschild managed assets worth $2 billion, and opened an office in Hong Kong.

Since 1997: Benjamin and Ariane de Rothschild era 

Following the death of his father in 1997, Benjamin de Rothschild became the president of La Compagnie Financière Edmond de Rothschild. In 1999, in Canada, in association with the Banque Laurentienne, LCF created the financial company BLC—Edmond de Rothschild Gestion d'Actifs Inc., which eventually led to the creation of B2B Banque. In 2001, LCF launched its first online banking website. In 2002, LCF launched the private equity structure Capital Partners. In 2005, Benjamin and Ariane de Rothschild launched the Edmond de Rothschild Foundations to unify and optimize the group's philanthropic operations. In 2006, LCF and Nikko Cordial Securities launched LCF Edmond de Rothschild Nikko Cordial, the first fully-fledged family office in Japan. In March 2008, LCF Edmond de Rothschild became the first foreign bank in China to own a share of a Chinese mutual fund manager when it bought 15% of Zhonghai Fund Management, and increased its participation to 25% in 2011. From 2000 to 2010, LCF Edmond de Rothschild opened 7 regional offices in France.

In 2009, Ariane de Rothschild became the vice-president of LCF Edmond-de-Rothschild. In 2010, La Compagnie Financière Edmond de Rothschild (LCF) changed its name to Edmond de Rothschild Group. In 2011, the group joined the UNEP FI program. In 2011, the group opened an office in Dubai to develop its activities in the Middle East and became a member of the United Nations Global Compact. In 2013, it announced its plan to open a new office in London. In 2014, after raising a $530 million fund targeting investments in Africa, all of the company's financial and non-financial assets were reorganized within the group's structure.

In 2015, Ariane de Rothschild was named CEO of the Edmond de Rothschild Group. She was the first woman to run a Rothschild-branded financial institution, and was nominated to give the company a new impetus. The group published a sustainability report for the first time, launched the Fund Big Data and, under the Swiss Bank Program, the group signed a joint non-prosecution agreement with the US Department of Justice to cooperate with this authority regarding undeclared US accounts in Switzerland. In 2016, the Société française des hôtels de montagne (SFHM) which gathered the non-financial assets of the group became Edmond de Rothschild Heritage. In 2017, the Luxembourg authorities fined the group $10.1 million in the aftermath of the 1MDB affair. In 2018, the group raised a €345 million fund to invest in biotech and medical devices. In March 2019, the company removed Edmond de Rothschild (Switzerland) S.A. from public trading, making it 100% private. Ariane de Rothschild took chairmanship of the board, and Vincent Taupin was named CEO of the group. The French business entities were folded into the Swiss holding company to simplify the group's organization.

In 2019, the Edmond de Rothschild Group launched an AI-powered fund to invest in the real estate market and raised €375 million for its fourth Africa-focused fund. The company's shares were delisted from the Zurich stock exchange on 22 October 2019. In 2020, the group made its first investment in the Baltics by backing the parking lot operator Parkdema and Sergey Bogdanchikov filed a lawsuit against the group. In January 2021, Benjamin de Rothschild died of a heart attack and Ariane de Rothschild became the sole majority owner of the Edmond de Rothschild Group, holding the majority of the votes with her four daughters. In 2021, the group launched a $250-million foodtech fund with PeakBridge VC and the Fund-Human Capital focused on companies with the best employee management practices. Yves Perrier joined the company's board and François Pauly replaced Vincent Taupin as CEO of the group. Edmond de Rothschild partnered with the UK-based wealth management firm Hottinger Group and acquired a 42.5% stake in the latter.

Description

The Edmond de Rothschild Group is a conviction-driven investment house. In 2021, the group had 2,500 employees, 31 offices in 13 countries and 3 international management centers (Geneva, Luxembourg, Paris). The group managed CHF 1778 billion worth of assets and recorded a solvency ratio of 23%. The Edmond de Rothschild Group provides the following services:

 Private banking
 Asset management
 Real estate
 Private equity
 Corporate finance
 Funds management

Other activities

 Edmond de Rothschild Heritage: The lifestyle assets managed by the Edmond de Rothschild Group are gathered under the label Edmond de Rothschild Heritage. Those assets include wines (Château Clarke, Château des Laurets, Château Malmaison, Flechas de los Andes, Rimapere, Rupert and Rothschild Vignerons, Macán, Champagne Barons de Rothschild, a majority stake in Château Lafite Rothschild), restaurants (1920, Kaïto, L'Auberge de la Cote 2000), hotels (Châlet du Mont d'Arbois, Four Seasons Hotel Megève, La Ferme du Golf) and gournet foods production (Brie de Meaux, Coulommiers, Merle Rouge, honey, olive oil, terrine, jam).
 Edmond de Rothschild Foundations: Following the philanthropic tradition of the Rothschild family, the Edmond de Rothschild Foundations is an international network of 10 foundations active in the fields of art and culture, health and research, philanthropy, cultural dialogue and social entrepreneurship.
 Gitana Team: Professional sailing team created by Benjamin de Rothschild in 2001

Governance

Presidents 
 Since 2019: Ariane de Rothschild
 1997–2019: Benjamin de Rothschild
 1953–1997: Edmond de Rothschild

Executive committee 
 François Pauly (CEO)

 Benoit Barbereau (Chief Operating Officer)
 Christophe Caspar (Head of Asset Management)
 Philippe Cieutat (Chief Financial Officer)
 Pierre-Étienne Durand (Head of Strategy)
 Diego Gaspari (Head of Human Resources)
 Hervé Ordioni (Head of Private Banking)
 Jean-Christophe Pernollet (Chief Risk / Legal / Compliance Officer)

See also 

Edmond Adolphe de Rothschild
Benjamin de Rothschild
Ariane de Rothschild
Rothschild family

References

External links 

Edmond de Rothschild Group

Banks of Switzerland
Investment banks
Banks established in 1953
Financial services companies established in 1953
French companies established in 1953
Swiss companies established in 1965
Edmond Adolphe de Rothschild